Itaka is an urban locality (an urban-type settlement) in Mogochinsky District of Zabaykalsky Krai, Russia. Population:

Geography 
Itaka is located in the Olyokma-Stanovik, near the upper reaches of the Tungir

References

Urban-type settlements in Zabaykalsky Krai